Bear Lake is a lake in King County in Washington, United States. It is the source of the Taylor River.

The lake can be reached by hiking  from Deer Lake along the Snoqualmie Lake Trail which eventually traverses into the Miller River system and reaches the shore of Lake Dorothy.

The lake is located just upstream from Deer Lake.  The Taylor River actually drops over a small waterfall after exiting the lake which is said to be visible from across Deer Lake.

See also
List of lakes in Washington

References 

Lakes of Washington (state)
Lakes of King County, Washington
Mount Baker-Snoqualmie National Forest